William Forster (1 March 1884 – 7 February 1930) was an Australian cricketer. He played one first-class match for Tasmania in 1907-08.

See also
 List of Tasmanian representative cricketers

References

External links
 

1884 births
1930 deaths
Australian cricketers
Cricketers from Gateshead
Tasmania cricketers